Hassan Usman Katsina (31 March 1933 – 24 July 1995), titled Chiroman Katsina, was the last Governor of Northern Nigeria. He served as Chief of Army Staff during the Nigerian Civil War and later became the Deputy Chief of Staff, Supreme Headquarters.

Early life 
Hassan Usman was born on March 31, 1933 in Katsina to the Fulani royal family of the Sullubawa clan. His father, Usman Nagogo, was the Emir of Katsina from 1944 to 1981. His grandfather, Muhammadu Dikko, was the 47th Emir of Katsina from 1906 to 1944.

Katsina was educated at Barewa College. He then proceeded to the Nigerian College of Arts, Science and Technology in Zaria.

Military career
In 1956, Katsina joined the Nigerian Army. As the military was still under colonial control, he trained at the Mons Officer Cadet School and the prestigious Royal Military Academy, Sandhurst. Following independence, Katsina rose through the ranks of the military. He commandeered troops in Kano and Kaduna, and served as an officer in the intelligence corps in the Congo Crisis receiving the Congo Medal. He was viewed as a prominent and senior Northern military officer, with links to the ruling class.

Coup d'état of 1966 

Following the 1966 Nigerian coup d'état, which resulted in the death of Premier Ahmadu Bello. Katsina was appointed Governor of Northern Nigeria. He served as a counter balance to the military hardliners led by General Murtala Mohammed, who wanted the region to secede following the death of Ahmadu Bello. He participated in the 1966 Nigerian counter-coup which overthrew General Johnson Aguiyi-Ironsi and brought General Yakubu Gowon to power. He was later appointed a member of the Supreme Military Council of Nigeria. 

Katsina stepped into a new position that was in need of strong leadership to calm nerves as a result of the military coup and the death of prominent regional political leaders. His government saw anti-Igbo sentiment intensify, resulting in the 1966 anti-Igbo pogrom, during which several cities were engulfed in a series of violent killings in reaction to the coup which resulted in the death of Ahmadu Bello and the introduction of the unitary system of government. Many Northerners feared these developments were part of a conspiracy to create an Igbo-dominated nation state.

Administration 
His government chose to carry on with the progress attained by Ahmadu Bello and brought aboard senior civil servants in the region who possessed administrative attributes that could continue with the progress. Key figures in his government included Ibrahim Dasuki; who later became Sultan of Sokoto, Ali Akilu; who later played a prominent role in the creation of states in Nigeria, and Sunday Awoniyi. His administration also saw the rise of the Kaduna Mafia, a new class of young Northern intellectuals, civil servants, and military officers.

During his brief period of leadership, he led the Interim Common Services Agency, an agency which undertook the task of sharing the collective resources of the region in a new decentralized political and economic system of governance. Katsina, also revitalized political linkage with the emirates as a support base for his new administration; and was close to re-introducing the old Native Administrative structures of the colonial system, where emirs played a major role.

Civil War 

In 1968, General Katsina was appointed Chief of Army Staff. In this position, he led the war effort by doubling the size of troops, blockading of supplies to Biafra, and utilised air support from the United Arab Republic. In 1970, he witnessed the unconditional surrender of Biafra to Nigeria.

Later life and death
Following the 1975 Nigerian coup d'état, General Katsina retired from the military as the most senior experienced military officer at the time. After his retirement, he rejected several government appointments. General Katsina was respected within the military class as he led the promotion of several young officers who later led the Military dictatorship in Nigeria. 

He was later involved in the formation of political organisations such as the National Party of Nigeria and the Committee of Concerned Citizens. He was also the president of the Nigerian Polo Association, of which his father Emir Usman Nagogo was life president; and pioneer of polo in Nigeria. 

General Katsina died on 24 July 1995 in Kaduna.

Titles and honours

Traditional titles 

 Chiroman Katsina (Crown Prince of the Katsina Emirate)

Military ranks

References

External links
History of Hassan Katsina

1933 births
1995 deaths
People from Katsina
Nigerian generals
Graduates of the Mons Officer Cadet School
Graduates of the Royal Military Academy Sandhurst
20th-century Nigerian politicians
Military personnel of the Nigerian Civil War
Chiefs of Army Staff (Nigeria)
Nigerian Muslims